U-Man (Meranno) is a fictional character appearing in American comic books published by Marvel Comics.

Publication history

U-Man first appears in Invaders #3 (Nov. 1975) and was created by Roy Thomas and Frank Robbins.

Fictional character biography
Meranno is an Atlantean warrior and scientist. Like hero Namor the Sub-Mariner, he is a member of the Atlantean race Homo mermanus. It is revealed in flashback that Meranno despised Namor when they were children, and in adulthood allies himself with Nazi Germany. Still consumed with hatred for Namor, the character reveals the location of the city of Atlantis to the German forces, who destroy the Atlantean fleet and place the then Emperor Thakorr in a coma. Thakorr is succeeded by Namor who banishes Meranno from Atlantis for treason.

Meranno adopts the alias of U-Man, and willingly submits to Nazi procedures that increase his size and strength. Joining a fleet of U-boats, U-Man wreaks havoc on the Allied fleet until defeated by the superhero team the Invaders. The character reappears in a two part story in the title Marvel Two-In-One, and with Nazi allies Brain Drain, Master Man, and Sky Shark, plans to sabotage New York City with a new super weapon. The plan, however, is foiled by time travelling Fantastic Four member the Thing and the Liberty Legion.

U-Man reappears in the title Invaders under the mental control of Japanese spy Lady Lotus, and battles teen group the Kid Commandos and the Invaders and joins the Nazi group Super-Axis for a final confrontation with the superhero team.

U-Man appears in the modern Marvel Universe during the Atlantis Attacks storyline, and features in an Avengers annual with fellow Namor foe Attuma in an attack on the surface world. The character becomes a reluctant ally in the title Avengers, aiding the superhero team, Canadian heroes Alpha Flight, and Soviet group the People's Protectorate in preventing a nuclear holocaust.

An issue of the limited series New Invaders reveals in flashback that U-Man raped Lady Lotus in retaliation for her earlier mind control. Lady Lotus eventually gives birth to their child Nia Noble.

Powers and abilities
As an Atlantean, Meranno can breathe and move freely underwater, as well as survive for an indefinite period on land. Courtesy of Nazi science, he has inhuman strength, stamina, durability, speed, agility, and reflexes. U-Man was trained in the arts of warfare.

References

Characters created by Frank Robbins
Characters created by Roy Thomas
Comics characters introduced in 1975
Fictional characters with superhuman durability or invulnerability
Fictional Nazi fugitives
Fictional rapists
Marvel Comics Atlanteans (Homo mermanus)
Marvel Comics characters with superhuman strength
Marvel Comics Nazis
Marvel Comics scientists
Marvel Comics supervillains